Garbarek is a surname. Notable people with the surname include:

Anja Garbarek (born 1970), Norwegian singer-songwriter
Jan Garbarek (born 1947), Norwegian jazz saxophonist